Penicillium lehmanii is a species of the genus of Penicillium.

References

lehmanii
Fungi described in 1980